is a 1956 Japanese film directed by Kazuo Mori.

Cast
 Kazuo Hasegawa
 Ichikawa Raizō VIII
 Fujiko Yamamoto
 Michiko Saga
 Eijiro Tono

References

External links
  http://www.raizofan.net/link4/movie2/zeni2.htm

1956 films
Daiei Film films
1950s Japanese films
Japanese mystery films
1950s mystery films